The 2017 BET Hip Hop Awards are a recognition ceremony held October 6 at the Fillmore Miami Beach at Jackie Gleason Theater in Miami Beach, Florida, and aired October 10 on the BET cable channel.  The nominations were announced on September 15, 2017. 

Kendrick Lamar, DJ Khaled, and Cardi B led the BET Hip-Hop Awards 2017 with nine nominations apiece. Kendrick and Cardi B tied for MVP of the Year, Single of the Year, Hustler of the Year, and Best Hip-Hop Video. Meanwhile, Khaled was out for the crown in the DJ of the Year, Best Hip-Hop Video, and Producer of the Year categories.

JAY-Z and Chance the Rapper were tied for the second-most nominations with five nods each. Both were nominated in categories like Lyricist of the Year, MVP of the Year, and Impact Track. Elsewhere, Future and Migos received four nominations apiece.

The show was notable for Eminem's slamming of Donald Trump in a freestyle rap, calling out the President for focusing on National Football League players' protests during "The Star Spangled Banner" instead of Puerto Rico's recovery efforts in the wake of Hurricane Maria, and delivering an ultimatum to Trump supporters who are also fans of the rapper to choose between the two of them.

Cyphers
 Cypher 1 - Ball Greezy, Denzel Curry, Ski Mask the Slump God, & Zoey Dollaz
 Cypher 2 - Fat Joe, Cyhi the Prynce, Belly
 Cypher 3 - JID, Ali Tomineek, Cozz, Kodie Shane
 Cypher 4 - Tee Grizzley, Little Simz, 6LACK, Mysonne, Axel Leon
 Cypher 5 - Eminem
Digital Cypher - Griselda, Boogie, Westside Gunn, Conway, Benny

Nominations
Winners highlighted in  Bold

Best Hip Hop Video 
 Kendrick Lamar – "HUMBLE."
 Cardi B – "Bodak Yellow"
 DJ Khaled featuring Rihanna and Bryson Tiller – "Wild Thoughts"
 French Montana featuring Swae Lee – "Unforgettable"
 Future – "Mask Off"

Best Collabo, Duo or Group 
 DJ Khaled featuring Rihanna and Bryson Tiller – "Wild Thoughts"
 French Montana featuring Swae Lee – "Unforgettable"
 Migos featuring Lil Uzi Vert – "Bad and Boujee"
 Rae Sremmurd featuring Gucci Mane – "Black Beatles"
 Yo Gotti featuring Nicki Minaj – "Rake It Up"

Hot Ticket Performer 
 Kendrick Lamar
 Cardi B
 Chance the Rapper
 Drake
 J. Cole

Lyricist of the Year 
 Kendrick Lamar
 Chance the Rapper
 Drake
 J. Cole
 JAY-Z

Video Director of the Year 
 Benny Boom
 Colin Tilley
 Dave Meyers & Missy Elliott
 Director X
 Hype Williams

DJ of the Year 
 DJ Khaled
 DJ Drama
 DJ Envy
 DJ Esco
 DJ Mustard

Producer of the Year 
 Metro Boomin
 DJ Khaled & Nasty Beatmakers
 DJ Mustard
 London On Da Track
 Mike WiLL Made It
 Pharrell Williams

MVP of the Year 
 DJ Khaled
 Cardi B
 Chance the Rapper
 JAY-Z
 Kendrick Lamar

Single of the Year 
Only the producer of the track nominated in this category.
 "Bodak Yellow" – Produced by J. White Did It (Cardi B)
 "Bad and Boujee" – Produced by Metro Boomin (Migos featuring Lil Uzi Vert)
 "HUMBLE." – Produced by Mike Will Made-It (Kendrick Lamar)
 "Mask Off" – Produced by Metro Boomin (Future)
 "Wild Thoughts" – Produced by DJ Khaled & Nasty Beatmakers (DJ Khaled featuring Rihanna and Bryson Tiller)

Album of the Year 
 Kendrick Lamar – DAMN.
 DJ Khaled – Grateful
 Future – Future
 J. Cole – 4 Your Eyez Only
 JAY-Z – 4:44
 Migos – Culture

Best New Hip Hop Artist 
 Cardi B
 Aminé
Kodak Black
Playboi Carti
Tee Grizzley

Hustler of the Year 
 Cardi B
 Chance the Rapper
 Diddy
 DJ Khaled
 JAY-Z
 Kendrick Lamar

Made-You-Look Award (Best Hip Hop Style) 
 Cardi B
 A$AP Rocky
 Future
 Migos
 Nicki Minaj

Best Mixtape 
 Cardi B – Gangsta Bitch Music, Vol. 2
 Gucci Mane – Droptopwop
 Juicy J – Gas Face
 Playboi Carti – Playboi Carti
 Tee Grizzley – My Moment
 Yo Gotti & Mike Will Made-It – Gotti Made-It

Sweet 16: Best Featured Verse 
 Nicki Minaj – "Rake It Up" (Yo Gotti featuring Nicki Minaj)
 Chance the Rapper – "I'm the One" (DJ Khaled featuring Justin Bieber, Quavo, Chance the Rapper and Lil Wayne)
 Gucci Mane – "Black Beatles" (Rae Sremmurd featuring Gucci Mane)
 Lil Uzi Vert – "Bad and Boujee" (Migos featuring Lil Uzi Vert)
 Ty Dolla $ign – "Ain't Nothing" (Juicy J featuring Wiz Khalifa & Ty Dolla $ign)
 Wiz Khalifa – "Ain't Nothing" (Juicy J featuring Wiz Khalifa & Ty Dolla $ign)

Impact Track 
 Jay-Z – "The Story of O.J."
 Cardi B – "Bodak Yellow"
 Kendrick Lamar – "HUMBLE."
 Kendrick Lamar – "DNA."
 Lecrae featuring Ty Dolla $ign – "Blessings"
 Tyler, The Creator featuring A$AP Rocky  – "Who Dat Boy"
 Nicki Minaj ft. Lil Wayne & Drake - No Frauds

I Am Hip Hop Icon
 Luther Campbell

Instabooth Freestyles 
Most freestyles via BET and their YouTube channel.

Participants 

 DJ Khaled and Asahd Khaled
 Big Tigger
 Millyz
 Dave East
 Bre-Z
 ASAP Ferg
 T-Pain
 Tammy Rivera
 Waka Flocka Flame
 Michael Dapaah (Big Shaq)
 Jasmin Brown (WatchJazzy)
 Vince Swann
 Tristen Winger
 Mysonne
 Cozz
 Tee Grizzley
 XXXTentacion
 Zoey Dollaz
 YFN Lucci
 King Combs
 Michael Blackson
 Axel Leon
 Mike Smiff
Dee-1

References

BET Hip Hop Awards